The Zwinin ( or Dschwynuw) is a mountain a few kilometers south of Stryi, Ukraine, in the Outer Eastern Carpathians. 

The peak is 1107 meters above sea level and the ridge is 10 kilometers long. Together with the River Stryi, the mountain is part of a national park called “natsional'ny park Skolivs'ki Beskydy” (National Park of the Skole Beskids).

In World War I a battle took place from 5 February – 9 April 1915. The South-East-Army of the Central Powers took the Zwinin under the leadership of Felix Graf von Bothmer.

References

Images 
 Images from the Zwinin 
 Кординати Гори Джвинув (1107.3 м) 

Mountains of the Eastern Carpathians
Mountains of Ukraine
One-thousanders of Ukraine